Bazeley or Bazely is a surname. Notable people with the surname include:

Darren Bazeley (born 1972), English footballer
Geoffrey Bazeley (1906–1989), British architect
George Bazeley (born 1984), Australian field hockey goalie
John Bazely (1740–1809), British Royal Navy admiral
Paul Bazely, English actor
Percival Bazeley (1909–1991), Australian scientist
Mark Bazeley (born 1970), English Actor

See also
USS Bazely (1863), a Union Navy tugboat/patrol boat during the American Civil War
HMS Bazely (K311), a Lend-Lease destroyer escort (originally USS Bazely)